Wild Kitty was a steel roller coaster located at Frontier City in Oklahoma City, Oklahoma, which opened at the start of the 2013 season on April 7, 2013. It closed at the end of the 2018 season and was replaced by Frankie's Mine Train.

History
Wild Kitty first appeared at Elitch Gardens in Denver, Colorado. The ride reopened on May 27, 1995 under the name Wild Kitten. The Wild Kitten name stayed until Six Flags purchased the park and themed the ride to Great Chase in 1999 after the Looney Tunes. In 2007, when PARC Management bought the park from Six Flags, Warner Bros. was dropped from the park. With the removal of the Looney Tunes theme, the ride was renamed to Tombstone Tumbler. Then in 2008 the park renamed the ride to Cactus Coaster.

In late 2012, Cactus Coaster was removed from Elitch Gardens and was transported to replace a coaster at Frontier City, Wild Kitty which operated from 1995-2012. Wild Kitty was removed at the end of the 2018 operating season and was replaced by Frankie’s Mine Train.

Ride
This was a simple junior roller coaster with a single lift hill and several small bunny hills laid out in an oval. The train would circuit this layout three times.

References 

Frontier City
Roller coasters introduced in 2013
Former roller coasters in Oklahoma
1991 establishments in Colorado
2012 disestablishments in Colorado
2013 establishments in Oklahoma